Naldanga is a village in Jhenaidah Sadar Upazila, Jhenaidah District, Bangladesh.

References

Populated places in Khulna Division